VEGAS ROCKS! Magazine is a rock music magazine founded in August 2004 by Sally Steele. It covers rock music currently on showcase in the Las Vegas, NV area especially '80s rock music artists. Vegas Rocks! Magazine is a bi-monthly publication available in print in the Las Vegas, NV area and also in select areas of California and Arizona, and online. Beginning in 2010, the magazine began hosting its yearly "Vegas Rocks! Magazine Music Awards" event in order to honor rock musicians.

History 
Vegas Rocks! Magazine started in August 2004. Its first issue covered the Van's Warped Tour and was a 14-page newspaper originally titled Las Vegas Rock City News. The title was later changed to Vegas Rocks! Magazine in January 2005 Steele founded Vegas Rocks Media, LLC. Vegas Rocks! Magazine has gone from a 16-page black and white 'zine to a glossy, full-color, 50-page bimonthly publication. It features calendars of club dates and concerts, ads for local bands, record labels, recording studios and music venues.

VEGAS ROCKS! Magazine Music Awards 
VEGAS ROCKS! Magazine produces and hosts the VEGAS ROCKS! Magazine Music Awards.

List of Vegas Rocks! Magazine Music awards 
 1st Annual Vegas Rocks! Magazine Music Awards took place Sunday, August 22 at the Las Vegas Hilton Hotel. Guests honored included: Lemmy Kilmister (Motörhead), Lita Ford, Dee Snider (Twisted Sister), Glenn Hughes (Deep Purple and Black Sabbath), James Kottak (The Scorpions), Flavor Flav, Vinnie Appice, Paul Shortino, Nick Oshiro (Static-X), and others. (2010)
 2nd Annual Vegas Rocks! Magazine Music Awards took place Sunday, Aug 21 at the Las Vegas Hilton Hotel. Guest honored included: Vince Neil (Mötley Crüe),  Sebastian Bach (Skid Row), Wayne Static (Static-X), Slim Jim Phantom (The Stray Cats), John 5, Steve Stevens (Billy Idol), Josie Stevens, Matt Sorum, Gilby Clarke & Steven Adler (Guns N' Roses), Carmine Appice, Levi Benton (Miss May I), and others. (2011)
 3rd Annual Vegas Rocks! Magazine Music Awards took place Sunday, August 26 at The Joint inside the Hard Rock Hotel and Casino (Las Vegas). Guests honored included: Sammy Hagar, David Coverdale (Whitesnake), Geoff Tate (Queensrÿche), Mark Kendall (Great White), Michael Schenker (The Scorpions), Blas Elias (Slaughter), Vinnie Paul (Pantera), Kip Winger (Winger), Marq Torien (Bullet Boys), Eddie Trunk (VH1 That Metal Show), Dead Sara and others. The 2012 VRMA Awards were broadcast internationally to a live audience on AXS TV. (2012)
 4th Annual Vegas Rocks! Magazine Music Awards took place Sunday, Aug 25 at the Joint in the Hard Rock Hotel (Las Vegas). Guests honored included: Carl Palmer (Emerson Lake & Palmer), Jon Anderson (YES), Zakk Wylde (Ozzy), Chris Holmes (W.A.S.P.), DJ Ashba, Tracii Guns & Stacey Blades of LA Guns, Rudy Sarzo (Dio/Quiet Riot), Jordan Rudess (Dream Theater), Danny Koker of The History Channel's Counting Cars, Ron Keel, Ron Jeremy and others. (2013)
 5th Annual Vegas Rocks! Magazine Music Awards took place Sunday, November 23 at the Pearl inside the Palms Casino Resort. Guests honored included: Nicolas Cage, Wes Cage, Steve Lukather & David Paich (TOTO), Michael Anthony (Van Halen), Stephen Pearcy (RATT), Orianthi (Michael Jackson & Alice Cooper), Rikki Rockett (Poison), Robert Sarzo (Hurricane) and others. (2014)
The Vegas Rocks! Magazine Hair Metal Awards took place at the Eastside Cannery Sunday, May 15, 2016. Guests honored and attending included Scorpions, Twisted Sister, Quiet Riot, Winger, Doro Pesch, Rudy Sarzo, BulletBoys, Criss Angel, Angel, Brian Tichy, Pretty Boy Floyd, and was hosted by Nick Hawk and Sally Steele.

References

External links 
 VegasRocks.com
 VegasRocksTV.com

Heavy metal publications
Music magazines published in the United States
Magazines established in 2004
Magazines published in Nevada
Bimonthly magazines published in the United States
2004 establishments in Nevada